In statistics, the Holm–Bonferroni method, also called the Holm method or Bonferroni–Holm method, is used to counteract the problem of multiple comparisons. It is intended to control the family-wise error rate (FWER) and offers a simple test uniformly more powerful than the Bonferroni correction. It is named after Sture Holm, who codified the method, and Carlo Emilio Bonferroni.

Motivation
When considering several hypotheses, the problem of multiplicity arises: the more hypotheses are checked, the higher the probability of obtaining Type I errors (false positives). The Holm–Bonferroni method is one of many approaches for controlling the FWER, i.e., the probability that one or more Type I errors will occur, by adjusting the rejection criteria for each of the individual hypotheses.

Formulation
The method is as follows:
 Suppose you have  p-values, sorted into order lowest-to-highest , and their corresponding hypotheses （null hypotheses). You want the FWER to be no higher than a certain pre-specified significance level .
 Is ? If so, reject  and continue to the next step, otherwise EXIT.
 Is ? If so, reject  also, and continue to the next step, otherwise EXIT.
 And so on: for each P value, test whether . If so, reject  and continue to examine the larger P values, otherwise EXIT.

This method ensures that the FWER is at most , in the strong sense.

Rationale
The cost of this protection against type I errors is an increased risk of failing to reject one or more false null hypotheses (i.e., of committing one or more type II errors).

 The index  identifies the first p-value that is not low enough to validate rejection. Therefore, the null hypotheses  are rejected, while the null hypotheses  are not rejected. 
 If  then no p-values were low enough for rejection, therefore no null hypotheses are rejected.
 If no such index  could be found then all p-values were low enough for rejection, therefore all null hypotheses are rejected (none are accepted).

Proof
Holm–Bonferroni controls the FWER as follows. Let  be a family of hypotheses, and   be the sorted p-values. Let  be the set of indices corresponding to the (unknown) true null hypotheses, having  members.

Let us assume that we wrongly reject a true hypothesis. We have to prove that the probability of this event is at most . Let  be such that  is the first rejected true hypothesis, in the ordering used during the Bonferroni–Holm test. Then are all rejected false hypotheses. Since  is rejected, it must be  by definition of the testing procedure. Using (1), the right hand side of this inequality is at most . Thus, if we wrongly reject a true hypothesis, there has to be a true hypothesis with P-value at most .

So let us define the random event . Whatever the (unknown) set of true hypotheses  is, we have  (by the Bonferroni inequalities). Therefore, the probability to reject a true hypothesis is at most .

Alternative proof
The Holm–Bonferroni method can be viewed as a closed testing procedure, with the Bonferroni correction applied locally on each of the intersections of null hypotheses.

The Holm-Bonferroni method is a shortcut procedure, since it makes  or less comparisons, while the number of all intersections of null hypotheses to be tested is of order .
It controls the FWER in the strong sense.

In the Holm–Bonferroni procedure, we first test . If it is not rejected then the intersection of all null hypotheses  is not rejected too, such that there exists at least one intersection hypothesis for each of elementary hypotheses  that is not rejected, thus we reject none of the elementary hypotheses.

If  is rejected at level  then all the intersection sub-families that contain it are rejected too, thus  is rejected.

However, since  already rejected, it sufficient to reject all the intersection sub-families of  without . Once  holds all the intersections that contains  are rejected.

The same applies for each .

Example 
Since the procedure is step-down, we first test , which has the smallest p-value . Since  we reject  as well and continue. The next hypothesis  is not rejected since . Note that even though  applies,  is not rejected. This is because the testing procedure stops once a failure to reject occurs.

Extensions

Holm–Šidák method

When the hypothesis tests are not negatively dependent, it is possible to replace  with:
 
resulting in a slightly more powerful test.

Weighted version
Let  be the ordered unadjusted p-values. Reject  as long as

Adjusted p-values
The adjusted p-values for Holm–Bonferroni method are:
 

The weighted adjusted p-values are:

A hypothesis is rejected at level α if and only if its adjusted p-value is less than α. In the earlier example using equal weights, the adjusted p-values are 0.03, 0.06, 0.06, and 0.02. This is another way to see that using α = 0.05, only hypotheses one and four are rejected by this procedure.

Alternatives and usage

The Holm–Bonferroni method is "uniformly" more powerful than the classic Bonferroni correction, meaning that it is always at least as powerful.

There are other methods for controlling the FWER that are more powerful than Holm–Bonferroni. Thus, The Hochberg procedure is uniformly more powerful than the Holm procedure. However, the Hochberg procedure requires the hypotheses to be independent or under certain forms of positive dependence, whereas Holm–Bonferroni can be applied without such assumptions. A similar step-up procedure is the Hommel procedure, which is uniformly more powerful than the Hochberg procedure.

Naming
Carlo Emilio Bonferroni did not take part in inventing the method described here. Holm originally called the method the "sequentially rejective Bonferroni test", and it became known as Holm–Bonferroni only after some time. Holm's motives for naming his method after Bonferroni are explained in the original paper:
"The use of the Boole inequality within multiple inference theory is usually called the Bonferroni technique, and for this reason we will call our test the sequentially rejective Bonferroni test."

References

Statistical hypothesis testing
Statistical tests
Multiple comparisons